Harrison Charles Williams (March 16, 1873 – November 10, 1953) was an American entrepreneur, investor, and multi-millionaire.

Early life
Harrison Williams was born in Avon Township, Ohio in 1873 to Everett Williams and Laurett A. Williams. He graduated from Elyria High School in 1890.

Adult life and career
In 1900, he married Katherine Gordon Breed in Pittsburgh. She died in 1915.

Williams abandoned an unsuccessful bicycle manufacturing business in Lorain in 1903. He went to New York City and took a job with a carpet sweeper company.

In 1906 he created American Gas & Electric Co., and six years later created another holding company, Central States Electric Corp.

During World War I he served as an assistant to Bernard Baruch, at the War Industries Board, in Washington D.C., through Baruch he was introduced to attorney John Foster Dulles, who represented Williams throughout his business career.

Philanthropy and social networks
When the Prince of Wales (later Edward VIII) visited the United States on various occasions, he was Williams' guest at Glen Cove, Long Island, in the house Williams rented from banker J. P. Morgan Jr., and later at Williams' own estate, Oak Point, located just a few miles east, in Bayville, on Pine Island.

In 1923, Williams financed and sponsored a trip to the Galápagos Islands through the New York Zoological Society that was led by naturalist William Beebe.  Because of his patronage, there is a volcano in the Galapagos named after him. With Vincent Astor and Marshall Field he also financed Beebe's expedition to the Sargasso Sea.  He also contributed financially to the American Museum of Natural History's 1926 expedition to Greenland, led by George P. Putnam.

Williams bought the Krupp-built Vanadis, then the largest private yacht afloat, with a cruising radius of 12,000 mi., renamed her Warrior, and refitted her for his own oceanographic and pleasure purposes. Today, as the Lady Hutton, she serves as a floating hotel in Stockholm harbor, Sweden.

Second marriage
In 1926, at age 53, after being a widower for 11 years, Williams married the divorcée Mona Bush, 24 years his junior.  Mona had begun life as Mona Strader, the daughter of a Kentucky horse farm worker. They departed on a year-long around-the-world honeymoon cruise on  the Warrior. The trip was chronicled by Paul Cravath, a prominent New York City attorney. In 1933 she became the first American voted the "Best Dressed Woman in the World."

The couple had several residences: one in Manhattan, one just outside New York City, and one in Florida. They bought the Willard D. Straight House at 94th Street and Fifth Avenue from steel magnate Elbert Gary. They bought "Blythedunes", designed by Maurice Fatio, at 513 North County Blvd., in Palm Beach, Florida.

They bought a Long Island estate in the village of Bayville. As "Dunstable", it had been the home of Winslow S. Pierce, the senior partner in the Wall Street law firm of Pierce & Greer, and the attorney for George Jay Gould I, the railroad executive and son of railroad financier Jay Gould. Williams renamed it "Oak Point", and commissioned architects Delano & Aldrich to convert the mansion from a Dutch Colonial exterior to an English Georgian motif. He also added an indoor tennis and swimming pavilion, several holes of golf, formal gardens designed by Beatrix Farrand & the Olmstead firm, and remodeled a U-shaped carriage house to accommodate his fourteen Rolls-Royce automobiles. This carriage house now serves as the Bayville village hall, library and museum.

In 1927, Williams commissioned muralist Jose Maria Sert to create paintings depicting tightrope walkers and acrobats to decorate the Art Deco lounge of the sports pavilion. Mona Williams later had these removed to her villa, "Il Fortino", on Italy's isle of Capri.

By 1929, Williams had accumulated a fortune estimated at a $680 million (equivalent of about $ billion in ) in public utilities, making him the one of the wealthiest men in the country. He also began a business partnership with Waddill Catchings of Goldman Sachs & Co.

In 1937 he was investigated regarding investment trusts by the Securities and Exchange Commission.  Also that year he began an affair with Coco Chanel.

Death and legacy
Williams died at Bayville in 1953. In 1955, his widow married her secretary, Count Albrecht "Eddy" Von Bismarck, thus becoming the Countess Von Bismarck. She spent much of the balance of her life living in Paris, and summering at her villa on the Isle of Capri, but returned to her Bayville estate several times each year. At Mona's death in 1983, by then known as "The Kentucky Countess," her will established the Mona Bismarck American Center for Art & Culture, at 34 Avenue de New York, Paris, dedicated to improving Franco-American cultural relations, which is housed in her former Parisian townhouse. The house also houses the American Club in Paris.

References

 John N. Ingham. Biographical dictionary of American business leaders.
 James D. Birchfield. Kentucky Countess: Mona Bismarck in Art and Fashion. Lexington, KY:  University of Kentucky Art Museum, 1997.

American company founders
People from Lorain County, Ohio
People from Bayville, New York
1873 births
1953 deaths